Houmen is a railway station located in Haifeng County, Shanwei City, Guangdong Province, China, on the Xiamen-Shenzhen Railway operated by the China Railway Guangzhou Group.

Railway stations in Guangdong